Tibás is the thirteenth canton in the province of San José in Costa Rica. The head city of the canton is San Juan.

History 
Tibás was created on 26 June 1914 by decree 31. It was formerly known as San Juan del Murciélago and was meant to be the capital of the country, at least according to ex-president Braulio Carrillo, this is the reason the town was originally designed with such a neat array of perfectly aligned blocks, cut by the streets running from North to South and the avenues from East to West.

Geography 
Tibás has an area of  km² and a mean elevation of  metres.

The canton forms a northern suburb of the national capital city of San José. It is triangular in shape, with the Virilla River as its northern boundary. The Quebrada Rivera, a canyon, establishes the southwestern limit of the canton and also a portion of the southeastern boundary.

Districts 
The canton of Tibás is subdivided into the following districts:
 San Juan
 Cinco Esquinas
 Anselmo Llorente
 León XIII
 Colima

Demographics 

For the 2011 census, Tibás had a population of  inhabitants.

Tibás includes both industrial and residential neighborhoods and is home of a popular football team in Costa Rica, Deportivo Saprissa and its stadium Estadio Ricardo Saprissa.

Transportation

Road transportation 
The canton is covered by the following road routes:

Rail transportation 
The Interurbano Line operated by Incofer goes through this canton.

References

Cantons of San José Province
Populated places in San José Province